Datong 2nd Power Station is a large coal-fired power station in China.

See also 

 List of coal power stations
List of major power stations in Shanxi

External links 

 Datong 2nd Power Station on Global Energy Monitor

References 

Coal-fired power stations in China